is a Japanese manufacturer and distributor of electric motors. Their products are found in hard-disk drives, electric appliances, automobiles and commercial and manufacturing equipment. The company has the largest global market share for the tiny spindle motors that power hard-disk drives.

The two product groups with the largest sales are hard-disk drive motors and automotive products with 16% and 22% of sales, respectively.

As of 2017, the company has 296 subsidiaries companies located across Japan, Asia, Europe and the Americas. Nidec is listed on the first section of the Tokyo Stock Exchange and is a constituent of the TOPIX 100 stock market index.

The company was number 42 on the 2005 edition of the Businessweek Infotech 100 list. Also Nidec was featured on the 2014 Forbes World's Most Innovative Companies list.

History

Nidec acquisitions
Nidec ASI. In 2012 Nidec acquired Ansaldo Sistemi Industriali S.p.A. which became Nidec ASI. Since 2012 Nidec ASI has been involved in comprehensive drive technology. As a part of the Nidec Group, the core business of Nidec ASI S.p.A. includes energy, marine, metals, oil & Gas and general industry (cement, water treatment, rubber and plastic, materials handling, glass, ceramics, paper and ropeway). Since 2014, Giovanni Barra has been CEO of Nidec ASI
Nidec Leroy-Somer. On January 31, 2017, Nidec acquired Leroy-Somer from Emerson Electric which became Nidec Leroy-Somer Holding.
Nidec Global Appliance Compressors GmbH. On July 31, 2017, Nidec acquired Secop GmbH, a German hermetic compressor manufacturer from Aurelius Equity Group, expanding further into the refrigeration market. Since April 28, 2018, Nidec has entered into an agreement with Whirlpool Corporation to acquire the refrigeration compressor business of Embraco. In response to antitrust concerns, in 2019 Nidec sold Secop.
In November 2018, Nidec became a shareholder of Nidec Chaun-Choung Technology Corporation, a long-established cooling company in Taiwan. In December 2019, it again announced that it would increase its shareholding from 49.01% to 53.48%, and reached 67% shareholding in December 2020.

References

External links
Nidec global website
Nidec America website 

Manufacturing companies of Japan
Defense companies of Japan
Auto parts suppliers of Japan
Industrial robotics
Manufacturing companies based in Kyoto
Companies listed on the Tokyo Stock Exchange
Companies listed on the Osaka Exchange
Companies listed on the New York Stock Exchange
Manufacturing companies established in 1973
1973 establishments in Japan
Electric motors
Japanese brands

Electric motor manufacturers